The lined seedeater (Sporophila lineola) is a species of bird in the family Thraupidae.

It is found in Argentina, Bolivia, Brazil, Colombia, Ecuador, French Guiana, Guyana, Panama, Paraguay, Peru, Suriname, and Venezuela. Its natural habitats are subtropical or tropical moist shrubland, pastureland, and heavily degraded former forest.

Taxonomy
The lined seedeater was formally described by the Swedish naturalist Carl Linnaeus in 1758 in the tenth edition of his Systema Naturae under the binomial name Loxia lineola. Linnaeus mistakenly specified the "habitat" as Asia; the type locality was subsequently designated as the state of Bahia in Brazil. The specific epithet lineola is Latin meaning "little line" (a diminutive of linea meaning "line"). The lined seedeater is now assigned to the genus Sporophila that was introduced by the German ornithologist Jean Cabanis in 1844. The species is monotypic: no subspecies are recognised.

Gallery

References

Further reading

lined seedeater
Birds of the Caatinga
Birds of Brazil
Birds of Paraguay
Birds of Argentina
lined seedeater
lined seedeater
Taxonomy articles created by Polbot